Human Reproduction is a peer-reviewed scientific journal covering all aspects of human reproduction, including reproductive physiology and pathology, endocrinology, andrology, gonad function, gametogenesis, fertilization, embryo development, implantation, pregnancy, genetics, preimplantation genetic diagnosis, oncology, infectious disease, surgery, contraception, infertility treatment, psychology, ethics, and social issues. It is an official journal of the European Society of Human Reproduction and Embryology. It was established in 1986 with Robert Edwards as founding editor-in-chief.

Spin-off journals 
The journals Human Reproduction Update and Molecular Human Reproduction are spin-offs from Human Reproduction that were established in 1995. The main journal concentrates on original research, clinical case studies, as well as opinions and debates on topical issues.
Human Reproduction Update is a bimonthly review journal. According to the Journal Citation Reports its 2019 impact factor is 12.684, ranking it first in the categories "Obstetrics and Gynaecology" (out of 79) and "Reproductive Biology" (out of 30).

Molecular Human Reproduction focuses on molecular aspects of reproductive biology and is published monthly. According to the Journal Citation Reports its 2019 impact factor is 3.636, ranking it 10th out of 41 in the category "Developmental Biology" and 6th out of 29 in the category "Reproductive Biology".

Abstracting and indexing 
All three journals are abstracted and indexed in Biological Abstracts, BIOSIS Previews, Current Contents, EMBASE/Excerpta Medica, PubMed/MEDLINE, ProQuest, and the Science Citation Index.

See also 
 Journal of Human Reproductive Sciences

References

External links 
 
 Human Reproduction Update homepage
 Molecular Human Reproduction homepage
 Publications page at European Society of Human Reproduction and Embryology website

English-language journals
Monthly journals
Bimonthly journals
Oxford University Press academic journals
Publications established in 1986
Publications established in 1995
Obstetrics and gynaecology journals